Cedar County News is a weekly newspaper serving Hartington, Nebraska and surrounding communities of Cedar County, Nebraska. It is published on Wednesdays and has an estimated circulation of 1,887.

The Cedar County News is owned by Northeast Nebraska News and published and edited by Rob Dump and Peggy Year.

History 
The Cedar County News was founded on January 13, 1898 by Z.M. Baird. In 1900, the paper was purchased by A.V. Parker. The paper was later owned by Frank Kelley and his son George, who sold the paper in 1914.

J.P. O'Furey purchased the Cedar County News in 1915 and he became president of the Nebraska Press Association in 1922. Under O'Furey, the paper achieved received statewide and national recognition for its publishing. The Cedar County News won the statewide award for best newspaper in 1925, and the national award for best community newspaper in 1929. In 1924, the paper received third place in a national community service contest by the National Editorial Association.

In 1934, while still under O'Furey, the Cedar County News absorbed two local papers, the Wynot Tribune and the Obert Times. O'Furey continued to publish the paper until his death in 1937. 
O'Furey was posthumously inducted into the Nebraska Newspaper Hall of Fame in 2016.The Hall of Fame is jointed operated by the Nebraska Press Association and the University of Nebraska-Lincoln College of Journalism and Mass Communications.
O'Furey's wife, L.M. O'Furey, continued owning and publishing the paper until 1940, when she sold the paper to Fred Zimmer.  Zimmer became president of Nebraska Press Association in 1950. Zimmer sold the paper in 1963 to Jack Lough, and later in 1965 died unexpectedly.

Lough, who also owned the Albion News, sold Cedar County News in 1973 to Mr. and Mrs. Donald L. Johnson. The Johnsons sold the paper to James C. Kelly and son Thomas Kelly in 1979.

Rob Dump and Peggy Year purchased the Cedar County News in 1992. They bought three additional papers in 1996: the Laurel Advocate, the Randolph Times and the Osmond Republican. They later purchased the Coleridge Blade and the Wausa Gazette, forming a group of newspapers known as Northeast Nebraska News.

In 2017, Peggy Year became president of the Nebraska Press Association. During that time, she and Rob launched NewsFirst, an app/widget that aggregates news stories from across 16 Nebraska newspapers. That year, the Cedar County News took home four awards from the National Newspaper Association, including first place in the freedom of information category, second place in the best photo essay category, first place in the best sports photo category, and honorable mention in the humorous column category.

In 2018, the Cedar County News received three awards from the National Newspaper Association, including first place in the humorous column category, and honorable mentions for feature photo and social media.

References

Cedar County, Nebraska
Newspapers published in Nebraska
1898 establishments in Nebraska